James Booth Sr. (February 6, 1753 – February 3, 1828) was the Secretary of State of Delaware (1778-1799) and the Delaware Supreme Court Chief Justice (1799-1828). His son James Booth Jr. would serve as Delaware's Chief Justice from 1841 until his death in 1855.

References

1753 births
1828 deaths
Delaware lawyers
Chief Justices of Delaware
Secretaries of State of Delaware
19th-century American lawyers